François Petit is a martial artist and actor best known for his portrayal of the original Sub-Zero in the 1995 film Mortal Kombat and as head doctor of the World Wrestling Federation in the mid-1990s.

Petit appeared in Beyond the Mat, a pro-wrestling documentary, attending to wrestling performer Mick Foley, after a dangerous stunt in a match. He worked as a doctor for the World Wrestling Entertainment (WWE), previously WWF.

References 

Living people
1971 births
French male actors